1949 in professional wrestling describes the year's events in the world of professional wrestling.

List of notable promotions 
Only one promotion held notable shows in 1949.

Calendar of notable shows

Championship changes

EMLL

NWA

Debuts
Debut date uncertain:
Angelo Poffo
Bobo Brazil
Harold Sakata
Ilio DiPaolo
Johnny Rougeau
Red Bastien
Rip Hawk
The Sheik
Verne Gagne
November  The Crusher

Births
Date of birth uncertain:
Johnny Rivera
John Garea 
January 2  Samoan Joe (died in 2015) 
January 7:
Chavo Guerrero Sr. (died in 2016)
Scott LeDoux (died in 2011)
January 15  Tony Salazar
January 16  Sir Oliver Humperdink (died in 2011)
January 17  Andy Kaufman (died in 1984) 
February 11  T. John Tibbedeux (died in 2013)
February 19  Black Man (died in 2022)
February 25  Ric Flair
March 9  Charlie Fulton (died in 2016) 
April 7: 
Steve DiSalvo
John Anson
April 12  Mighty Inoue
April 26  Jerry Blackwell (died in 1995) 
April 27  Yoshiaki Fujiwara
April 28  Siva Afi
May 14  Robert Fuller
May 17: 
Earl Hebner
Dave Hebner (died in 2022)
May 18  Sailor White (died in 2005) 
June 17  Evgeny Artyukhin Sr. (died in 2008) 
June 29  Stephen Cepello 
August 13  Jim Brunzell
August 14  Bob Backlund
August 29  Stan Hansen
September 5  El Hijo del Gladiador
September 10:
Don Muraco
Gerry Morrow
September 19  Ringo Mendoza
September 25  Villano II (died in 1989) 
October 4:
Mike Adamle
Joe Pedicino (died in 2020)
October 12  César Curiel
October 18  Cien Caras
October 26:
Austin Idol
Kevin Sullivan
El Satánico
Troy Graham (died in 2002)
October 29  Paul Orndorff (died in 2021)
November 11  Mike Jackson
November 28  Lee Marshall (died in 2014)
November 29:
Dutch Mantell
Jerry Lawler

Deaths
August 8  Ivan Poddubny , 77
September 11  Ray Steele (49)

References

 
professional wrestling